Huntington Drive is a major thoroughfare that begins in the Rose Hills community in Los Angeles, California and heads east/northeast to Irwindale, California.  The street was named after railroad magnate Henry Huntington. It also served as one of the only thoroughfares between Los Angeles and Pasadena in the early 1900s.  Portions of Huntington Drive were part of U.S. Route 66. The road has a wide median that was originally one of the lines of the Pacific Electric Railway.

Route Description
Huntington Drive begins at Soto Street in Lincoln Heights.  South of Soto St. the road is Mission Road.  The street heads north but quickly heads northeast through El Sereno, Los Angeles and then into South Pasadena, California. In South Pasadena, Huntington Drive intersects with Fair Oaks Avenue.  The portion from Soto Street to Fair Oaks was part of the original routing for US 66. Past South Pasadena, Huntington continues through San Marino, California and passes just south of the Huntington Library. The road then goes through East San Gabriel, California and then Arcadia, California where it merges with Colorado Boulevard near Santa Anita Park.  At this junction, Huntington Drive becomes another portion of US 66, passing through Monrovia, California and Duarte, California until Irwindale where it continues as Foothill Boulevard.

History
Huntington Drive was the major route between Los Angeles and Pasadena in the early 1900s until the opening of the Arroyo Seco Parkway.  The median was a line of the Pacific Electric Railway which was owned by the street's namesake, Henry Huntington.  When the railway discontinued service in 1951, the large median became a large lawn with trees, and the roadways either side of the median were reconfigured from bidirectional traffic to one-way traffic.  In the 1930s, traveling on Huntington would have drove you by the Cawston Ostrich Farm in South Pasadena and in Monrovia a hot dog stand, the first restaurant opened by the McDonald brothers who would later create the fast-food restaurant McDonald's.  Huntington Drive between Soto Street and Fair Oaks Avenue was the original alignment of US 66 from 1926 until around 1936 when it was re-routed to eventually the Arroyo Seco Parkway.  Between Colorado Boulevard east to the Irwindale city limit it was signed as US 66 until it was decommissioned. The city of Duarte stenciled Route 66 logos onto the street in 2017 to commemorate the city's 60th anniversary.

Major Intersections
Mission Road/Soto Street
Main Street
Fair Oaks Avenue
Garfield Avenue
Atlantic Boulevard
Rosemead Boulevard (State Route 19)
Colorado Boulevard
Interstate 210
Interstate 605

References

Streets in the San Gabriel Valley
Streets in Pasadena, California